Elachyophtalma doreyana is a moth in the family Bombycidae. It was described by Walter Rothschild in 1920. It is found on New Guinea.

The wingspan is 38–57 mm. Adults are uniform rufous chocolate, with a small yellow half-moon-shaped discocellular stigma on the forewings, and white streaks on the abdominal margin of the hindwings.

References

Bombycidae
Moths described in 1920